Silver and Black may refer to:

Silver & Black (album) by Luniz, 2002
Silver & Black (unproduced film)
A nickname for the Las Vegas Raiders